Karuppurpadugai is a village in the Papanasam taluk of Thanjavur district, Tamil Nadu, India.

Demographics 

As per the 2001 census, Karuppurpadugai had a total population of 511 with 244 males and 267 females. The sex ratio was 1094. The literacy rate was 44.93.

References 

 

Villages in Thanjavur district